Trading Pieces is the debut full-length studio release by death metal band Deeds of Flesh. It was released in 1996.

Track listing

Personnel
Jacoby Kingston - Bass, vocals
Erik Lindmark - Guitar, vocals
Joey Heaslet - Drums

External links
 
 MySpace Profile

 

Deeds of Flesh albums
1996 albums